Park H. Pollard (1869 – December 26, 1956) was an American politician and businessman who served from 1912 to 1942 as chairman of the Democratic Party of Vermont, as well as several terms in the Vermont House of Representatives where he represented the town of Cavendish. He was the Democratic nominee for the U.S. Senate in 1923, and for Governor of Vermont in 1930 and 1942.

Political career
Pollard became chairman of the Vermont Democratic Party in 1912, being appointed to the Vermont Public Service Board by Governor Allen M. Fletcher the following year. He was first elected to the Vermont House of Representatives in 1916, representing the town of Cavendish. In April 1917 Pollard was nominated to the Vermont Board of Control by Governor Horace F. Graham, but his nomination was blocked by the Vermont Senate. This blockage was denounced by some commentators as an act of petty partisanship, but other observers contended that the Senate's decision was motivated by other reasons.

Pollard was not re-elected in 1918, but was elected again in 1920. While in the state house he was noted for his ability to block legislation, due to his strong ties with rural representatives. Pollard's legislative focus was on what he deemed unnecessary spending, and he was often considered a conservative Democrat.

Pollard was the Democratic nominee in the 1923 special election to fill the U.S. Senate seat that had been vacated by the death of William P. Dillingham. Due to Vermont's traditionally Republican lean, he was considered to have next to no chance of winning. Pollard attempted to define the race around the issue of Prohibition, taking a "wet" stance that advocated for amending the Volstead Act to be less restrictive, and attempting to appeal to supporters of wet Republican John W. Redmond, who had been defeated by "dry" candidate Porter H. Dale in the Republican primary. Pollard was defeated by Dale, 66%-33%.

Pollard endorsed John W. Davis for President in 1924. He was nominated by both the Democratic and Republican parties for re-election as state representative that year, but declined the nominations for unspecified personal reasons.

Pollard was the Democratic nominee for Governor in 1930, once again running as a wet. During the campaign, he favored the total repeal of the Eighteenth Amendment and the Volstead Act. He lost heavily to Lieutenant Governor Stanley C. Wilson. Pollard was again the Democratic nominee for Governor in 1942, losing to incumbent Governor William H. Wills, and stepped down as party chair that same year.

Death
Pollard died on December 26, 1955, in a Waterbury hospital.

Personal life
Pollard was a cousin of President Calvin Coolidge. He married Edith Johnson in 1894; the couple had one daughter.

References

Democratic Party members of the Vermont House of Representatives
1869 births
1956 deaths